Rocco Forte Hotels is a British hotel group that was established in 1996 by hotelier Sir Rocco Forte and his sister, Olga Polizzi. Their 14 hotels are located in European cities, as well as beach resorts in Sicily and Apulia. Sir Rocco Forte is Chairman and Chief Executive, while Olga Polizzi is Deputy Chairman and Director of Design.

History
Following the takeover of the Forte Group by Granada plc in 1996, Sir Rocco Forte and Olga Polizzi (the children of hotel magnate Lord Forte) formed RF Hotels. The rights to the Forte name were initially lost in 1996, when Granada plc bought the Forte Group. The first hotel purchased by the newly formed company in 1997 was a former Forte Group hotel, The Balmoral Hotel in Edinburgh, which had been put up for sale by new owners Granada plc.

In 2001, following the de-merger of Compass Group from Granada's media interests, the use of the Forte trademark was returned to Sir Rocco Forte in a gesture intended to dispel the bitter legacy of the takeover.

In 2003, the company changed its name to Rocco Forte Hotels, and The Rocco Forte Collection on 29 July 2007. The group name then reverted to Rocco Forte Hotels in 2011. The group's sales offices are located in London, Rome, Frankfurt, Moscow, Madrid, New York City and Los Angeles. As a brand of Rocco Forte Hotels Limited, the group owns and manages luxury five-star hotels. Brown's Hotel, Hotel de Rome and Hotel Amigo are members of The Leading Hotels of the World.

List of hotels
The Balmoral Hotel, Edinburgh - 1997

Hotel Savoy, Florence - 1997

Hotel Astoria, St Petersburg - 1999

Hotel Amigo, Brussels - 2000

Hotel de Russie, Rome - 2000

Brown’s Hotel, London - 2003

Hotel de Rome, Berlin - 2006

The Charles Hotel, Munich - 2007

Verdura Resort, Sicily - 2009

Masseria Torre Maizza, Apulia - 2019

Hotel de la Ville, Rome - 2019

Villa Igiea, Palermo - 2020

Next openings 

The Carlton, Milan

Related hotels
Angleterre Hotel in St. Petersburg, Russia, is also owned by Rocco Forte & Family PLC but is not part of Rocco Forte Hotels. 
Hotel Endsleigh in the Tamar Valley, England and Hotel Tresanton in St. Mawes, England, are privately owned by Sir Rocco Forte's sister, Olga Polizzi. 
Chateau de Bagnols in Beaujolais, France, was sold in 2007 to Von Essen Hotels.
St David's Hotel & Spa in Cardiff was sold in 2007 to Principal Hayley Group. 
In 2013, management of The Augustine Hotel in Prague reverted to the owner, Waldeck Capital. It is now managed by Marriott International under the Luxury Collection brand.
Rocco Forte's hotel in Abu Dhabi also changed management in 2013, initially to become the independent Al Maqta Hotel but later the Hilton Capital Grand Abu Dhabi.

References

Hotel and leisure companies of the United Kingdom
Hotel chains
Hotel and leisure companies based in London
Forte family